Travis John Richards (born March 22, 1970) is an American former professional ice hockey defenseman. He played briefly in the National Hockey League with the Dallas Stars.

Richards played ten seasons for the minor-league Grand Rapids Griffins. He is the first player with his jersey retired by the club, and was the only until Michel Picard's uniform was retired on February 19, 2022

Playing career
Richards graduated from Robbinsdale Armstrong High School in Plymouth, Minnesota in 1988. Richards was a member of the University of Minnesota Gophers hockey program before making his professional debut during the 1993-94 season.  A child psychology major, Richards would spend four years at the University of Minnesota where his brother Todd was a Gopher from 1985 to 1989. Earning WCHA Second Team All-Star honors on defense in 1992 and in 1993, Richards would join the US National Team at the 1993 World Championships at the end of his senior year.

Drafted by the Minnesota North Stars of the National Hockey League in the ninth round (169th overall) of the 1988 NHL Entry Draft, Richards played only three games in the NHL for the Dallas Stars. On July 26, 1996, Richards became the second player ever to sign with the Grand Rapids Griffins, then of the International Hockey League, now of the American Hockey League.  Richards played in each of the team's first ten seasons and became team captain in 2001.  He holds the record for most career games as a Griffin with 655.  Richards's number 24 was retired by the Griffins upon his retirement, becoming the first number retired by the club.

Personal
For a time, Richards was the hockey director at The Edge Ice Arena in Holland, Michigan. He resides in Grand Rapids, Michigan and has three children.

Career statistics

Regular season and playoffs

International

Awards and honors

References

External links

1970 births
Living people
American men's ice hockey defensemen
Dallas Stars players
Grand Rapids Griffins (IHL) players
Grand Rapids Griffins players
Ice hockey players from Minnesota
Ice hockey players at the 1994 Winter Olympics
Kalamazoo Wings (1974–2000) players
Minnesota Golden Gophers men's ice hockey players
Minnesota North Stars draft picks
Olympic ice hockey players of the United States
People from Crystal, Minnesota